Alexey I. Ekimov is a Russian solid state physicist who discovered the semiconductor nanocrystals known as quantum dots, while working at the Vavilov State Optical Institute. He was awarded the 1975 USSR State Prize in Science and Engineering for work on electron spin orientation in semiconductors. He is co-recipient of the 2006 R. W. Wood Prize of the Optical Society of America for "discovery of nanocrystal quantum dots and pioneering studies of their electronic and optical properties". He currently works for Nanocrystals Technology Inc.

References

Russian physicists
Living people
Year of birth missing (living people)
Soviet physicists